Krojanker, Kroyanker, Krojanski, Krojansky, Krajenski, Krajensky, Krajeski  are toponymic surnames ("-er": Germain/Yiddish, "-ski": Polish, "-sky": transliterated Polish) derived from the German name Krojanke or Polish name of the location Krajenka. Notable people with the surnames include:

David Kroyanker (born 1939), Israeli architect and architectural historian
Thomas C. Krajeski (born 1950), American diplomat 

Fictional characters
Ambassador Krajensky from Star Trek ,e.g., in Dominion

References

Polish toponymic surnames
German toponymic surnames
Yiddish-language surnames